The Hengli Group is a Chinese company active in oil refining, petrochemicals, polyesters and textiles. It operates the world's largest terephthalic acid (PTA) factory.

Hengli was founded in Suzhou as a weaving factory in 1994 by husband and wife Chen Jianhua and Fan Hongwei.

One of the world's largest companies, Hengli was ranked 67th in the Fortune Global 500 for 2021, and 3rd on a list of China's top 500 Private Enterprises.

It is described as "focused on energy efficiency in both their products and processes."

Three subsidiaries are publicly traded:
Hengli Petrochemical Co., Ltd., (“Hengli Petrochemical Co., Ltd.” Stock Code: 600346.SH)
Guangdong Songfa Ceramics Co., Ltd. ("Songfa INC." Stock Code: 603268.SH)
Suzhou Wujiang Tongli Lake Co., Ltd. (“Tongli Tourism” Stock Code: 834199.OC)

Hongli has production bases in Suzhou, Dalian, Suqian, Nantong, Yingkou, Luzhou, Yulin, Huizhou and Guiyang.

In 2020, environmentalists criticised the Hengli Group's plans to begin manufacturing plastics from coal.

In 2021, the company was criticised for seeking only male candidates for positions as drivers in Guizhou.

References

External links
 

Textile companies of China
Chinese companies established in 1994
Manufacturing companies based in Suzhou
Petrochemical companies